Thriller is the debut studio album by Australian funk band Swoop. The album was released in October 1993.

At the ARIA Music Awards of 1994, the album was nominated for ARIA Award for Best New Talent, losing out to Get On Board by The Badloves.

Track listing

Release history

References

1993 debut albums